Pool D of the 2015 Rugby World Cup began on 19 September and was completed on 11 October 2015. The pool was composed of France (the 2011 runners-up), Ireland and Italy – who all qualified automatically for the tournament due to finishing in the top three positions in their pools in 2011 – joined by the top American qualifier, Canada, and the second European qualifier, Romania. The top two teams; Ireland and France qualified for the quarter finals.

Overall

All times are local United Kingdom time (UTC+01)

Ireland vs Canada

France vs Italy

Notes:
Martin Castrogiovanni became Italy's most capped player with 114 caps.

France vs Romania

Italy vs Canada

Notes:
Mauro Bergamasco equalled Samoa's Brian Lima record of competing in five consecutive Rugby World Cup tournaments.

Ireland vs Romania

Notes:
The match attendance of 89,267 surpassed the Rugby World Cup's previous record of 89,019, set just seven days earlier during the match between New Zealand and Argentina.

France vs Canada

Notes:
Rémy Grosso (France) made his international debut.

Ireland vs Italy

Canada vs Romania

Notes:
 Mihai Lazăr and Valentin Popîrlan (Romania) earned their 50th test caps.	
 This match was the biggest comeback in Rugby World Cup history.

Italy vs Romania

Notes:
 Andrei Rădoi (Romania) earned his 50th test cap.	
 Tudorel Bratu (Romania) made his international debut.

France vs Ireland

Notes:
 Louis Picamoles (France) earned his 50th test cap.

References

External links
 Official RWC 2015 Site

Pool D
2015–16 in Irish rugby union
2015–16 in French rugby union
2015–16 in Italian rugby union
2015–16 in Romanian rugby union
2015 in Canadian rugby union